The 2020 Collingwood Football Club season is the club's 124th season of senior competition in the Australian Football League (AFL). The club also fielded its women's team in the AFL Women's competition though because of the COVID-19 pandemic it did not field reserves sides in the Victorian Football League and VFL Women's competitions.

Squad
 Players are listed by guernsey number, and 2020 statistics are for AFL regular season and finals series matches during the 2020 AFL season only. Career statistics include a player's complete AFL career, which, as a result, means that a player's debut and part or whole of their career statistics may be for another club. Statistics are correct as of the 1st Semi Final of the 2020 season (10 October 2020) and are taken from AFL Tables.

Squad changes

In

Out

AFL season

Pre-season matches

Regular season
Due to the COVID-19 pandemic, the AFL started the first round playing in empty stadium and announced the league would be shortened to 17 rounds. Following the first round, the league was suspended due to the pandemic, and was resumed later in mid-June.

Finals series

Ladder

Awards & Milestones

AFL Awards
 2020 22under22 selection – Josh Daicos
 AFL Players Association Best Captain – Scott Pendlebury
 2020 All-Australian team – Taylor Adams, Darcy Moore
 2020 Goal of the Year – Josh Daicos

AFL Award Nominations
 Round 17 – 2020 AFL Rising Star nomination – Isaac Quaynor
 2020 All-Australian team 40-man squad – Taylor Adams, Brayden Maynard, Darcy Moore, Scott Pendlebury

Club Awards
  – Taylor Adams
  – Scott Pendlebury
  – Jack Crisp
  – Darcy Moore
  – Brayden Maynard
  – Nathan Murphy
  – Jeremy Howe
  – Isaac Quaynor
  – Brody Mihocek
  – Taylor Adams
  – Brody Mihocek

Milestones
 Round 1 – Tyler Brown (AFL debut)
 Round 2 – Darcy Cameron (Collingwood debut)
 Round 3 – Brayden Maynard (100 games)
 Round 5 – Chris Mayne (50 Collingwood games)
 Round 6 – Will Kelly (AFL debut)
 Round 6 – Atu Bosenavulagi (AFL debut)
 Round 9 – Mark Keane (AFL debut)
 Round 10 – Trey Ruscoe (AFL debut)
 Round 10 – Brody Mihocek (50 games)
 Round 14 – Jaidyn Stephenson (50 games)
 Round 14 – Nathan Buckley (200 games coached)
 Round 15 – Max Lynch (AFL debut)
 Round 17 – Jack Crisp (150 AFL games)
 Round 17 – Josh Thomas (100 games)
 Elimination Final – Taylor Adams (150 AFL games)
 Elimination Final – Brodie Grundy (150 games)

AFLW season

Pre-season matches

Regular season

Finals series

Ladder

Squad
 Players are listed by guernsey number, and 2020 statistics are for AFL Women's regular season and finals series matches during the 2020 AFL Women's season only. Career statistics include a player's complete AFL Women's career, which, as a result, means that a player's debut and part or whole of their career statistics may be for another club. Statistics are correct as of the Semi final of the 2020 season (21 March 2020) and are taken from Australian Football.

Squad changes
In

Out

League awards
 2020 22under22 selection – Chloe Molloy (captain)
 2020 AFL Women's All-Australian team – Jaimee Lambert, Sharni Layton

Club Awards
 Best and fairest – Jaimee Lambert
 Best first year player – Alana Porter and Aishling Sheridan
 Best finals player – Brittany Bonnici
 Players' player award – Sharni Layton
 Leading goalkicker – Jordan Membrey (7 goals)

VFL/VFLW seasons (cancelled)

Collingwood had been expected to field a reserves men's team in the Victorian Football League for a thirteenth consecutive season. The AFL however issued a direction to all 18 clubs mandating that no AFL-listed player at a club could participate in a second-tier state league amidst the COVID-19 pandemic and the season was cancelled indefinitely. Collingwood also did not field a team in the VFL Women's league, as the competition was reduced to a four-team Super Series.

Notes
 Key
 H ^ Home match.
 A ^ Away match.

 Notes
Collingwood's scores are indicated in bold font.

See also
 2020 Collingwood Magpies Netball season

References

External links
 Official website of the Collingwood Football Club
 Official website of the Australian Football League

2020
Collingwood Football Club
Collingwood